Silaš is a small village in the Šodolovci municipality in Osijek-Baranja County, Croatia. At the time of 2011 Census village's population was 476. Most people go past it to get to a bigger and better city or village. Silaš was established in 1922 in the aftermath of the World War I on the spot of abandoned Eltz seigniory. Its original inhabitants were families of Serb soldiers who participated in the Salonica front battles against the German Empire, Austria-Hungary and Bulgaria. They were settled by the newly established Kingdom of Serbs, Croats and Slovenes. It was established because Serb soldiers wanted to make a place which they can stay in and defend, so they made a small sized village.

Geography
Šodolovci Municipality is divided into two parts with village Palača and Silaš constituting an exclave separated from the rest of municipality by Ernestinovo Municipality and the village of Laslovo on its closest point. In addition, Silaš Exclave is in itself de facto pene-enclave as the main road between Palača and Silaš goes through the village of Korođ in neighboring Vukovar-Srijem County.

See also
Šodolovci Municipality

References

Populated places in Osijek-Baranja County
Joint Council of Municipalities
Serb communities in Croatia